Cătălin Vasile Căbuz (born 18 June 1996) is a Romanian professional footballer who plays as a goalkeeper for Liga I club Chindia Târgoviște.

Club career
Born in Avrig, Sibiu County, Căbuz grew up at local academies of FC Sibiu, Șoimii Sibiu or Voința Sibiu, but also played for Gheorghe Hagi Football Academy squads in 2 periods. At senior level Căbuz never played in an official match for Viitorul Constanța, being loaned to different teams such as: Râmnicu Vâlcea, Chindia Târgoviște or Hermannstadt.

Honours
Hermannstadt
Cupa României runner-up: 2017–18
Viitorul Constanța
Supercupa României: 2019

References

External links

1996 births
Living people
People from Avrig
Romanian footballers
Association football goalkeepers
Romania youth international footballers
Romania under-21 international footballers
CSU Voința Sibiu players
Liga I players
FC Viitorul Constanța players
Liga II players
Liga III players
SCM Râmnicu Vâlcea players
AFC Chindia Târgoviște players
FC Hermannstadt players